Guillaume LeBlanc (born April 14, 1962 in Sept-Îles, Quebec) is a Canadian former athlete who mainly competed in the 20 kilometre walk.

A winner of the 20 km event at the 1989 Jeux de la Francophonie he competed for Canada at the 1992 Summer Olympics held in Barcelona, Spain, where he won the silver medal in the 20 kilometre walk event.

Personal bests
20 km: 1:21:13 hrs –  Saint Léonard, 5 October 1986
50 km: 3:56:46 hrs –  Ciudad de México, 5 April 1992

Achievements

See also
 Canadian records in track and field

References

External links
 
 
 
 
 

1962 births
Athletes (track and field) at the 1982 Commonwealth Games
Athletes (track and field) at the 1984 Summer Olympics
Athletes (track and field) at the 1986 Commonwealth Games
Athletes (track and field) at the 1988 Summer Olympics
Athletes (track and field) at the 1990 Commonwealth Games
Athletes (track and field) at the 1992 Summer Olympics
Living people
Olympic track and field athletes of Canada
Olympic silver medalists for Canada
Commonwealth Games gold medallists for Canada
Commonwealth Games silver medallists for Canada
Commonwealth Games bronze medallists for Canada
People from Sept-Îles, Quebec
Sportspeople from Quebec
Canadian male racewalkers
Commonwealth Games medallists in athletics
World Athletics Championships athletes for Canada
Medalists at the 1992 Summer Olympics
Olympic silver medalists in athletics (track and field)
Universiade medalists in athletics (track and field)
Universiade gold medalists for Canada
Medallists at the 1982 Commonwealth Games